The 1999–2000 season was Reading F.C.'s second consecutive season in Division Two, following their relegation from the Division One in 1998.

Season events
In July, midfielder Byron Glasgow tested positive cocaine and cannabis, and was subsequently sacked by the club.

On 17 September, Manager Tommy Burns and Assistant Manager Packie Bonner where sacked by the club due to poor results, with Alan Pardew being announced as the Caretaker Manager.

In February, Andy McLaren become the second Reading player to test positive for cocaine within the last year, and was sacked by the club.

Squad

Out on loan

Left club during season

Transfers

In

Loan in

Out

Loans out

Released

Competitions

Second Division

Results summary

Results by round

Results

League table

FA Cup

League Cup

League Trophy South

Squad statistics

Appearances and goals

 
 
 
 

 
 
 
 

 
 

 
 

 
 
 
 

 

 
 
 

 
 

|-
|colspan="14"|Players away on loan:
 
|-
|colspan="14"|Players who appeared for Reading but left during the season:
 

 
  
 
|}

Goal scorers

Clean sheets

Disciplinary record

Notes

References

Reading 1999–2000 at soccerbase.com

Reading F.C. seasons
Reading